Jason Burkey (born 1985) is an American actor.

Filmography

Film

References

External links

Road Less Traveled   https://www.google.com/search?q=road+less+traveled+cast&oq=road+less+traveled&aqs=chrome.4.69i57j46l2j0l3j69i65j69i64.7910j0j7&sourceid=chrome&ie=UTF-8

1985 births
Living people